The Indian locomotive class WAP-4 is a class of 25 kV AC electric locomotives that was developed in 1993 by Chittaranjan Locomotive Works for Indian Railways. The model name stands for broad gauge (W), AC Current (A), Passenger traffic (P) engine, 4th generation (4). They entered service in late 1994. A total of 778 WAP-4 were built at CLW between 1993 and 2015, which made them the most numerous class of mainline electric passenger locomotive until the WAP-7.

The WAP-4 is one of the most successful locomotives of Indian Railways serving both passenger and freight trains for over 29 years. This class provided the basic design for other locomotives like the WAP-6 . Despite the introduction of more modern types of locomotives like WAP-7, a significant number are still in use, both in mainline duties. Production of this class was halted in December 2015 with locomotive number 25051 being the last unit to be rolled out.

As of September 2022, all locomotives except those lost in accidents still retain "operational status" on the mainline as WAP-4, with further examples having been converted from WAP-6.

History

Development 
The WAP-4 class was developed after its predecessor, the WAP-1, was found inadequate to haul the longer, heavier express trains (24-26 coaches) that were becoming the mainstay of the Indian Railways network. IR/RDSO had realized that the reason for the WAP-1’s performance problems were the low-powered 770 hp Alstom TAO 859 traction motors. These were previously used with for the WAM-4 and WAG-5 classes but were too underpowered for modern requirements. At that time, new 840 hp Hitachi 15250 traction motors which had been adopted for use on newer WAG-5s was showing promise. So, these traction motors were adopted on to WAP-1s Flexicoil Mark I fabricated bogies, and with a new indigenously designed 5400 kVA transformer and silicon rectifiers.

It also was among the first locomotives to get a microprocessor-based control and fault diagnostics system. To accommodate the heavier Hitachi motors without increasing its 112t overall weight, the WAP-4 was made substantially lighter by the widespread use of aluminum materials in construction. The underframe of WAP-4 is narrower and lighter and also completely different from that of the WAP-1 to enable it to handle higher loads.

Design 

The loco has a streamlined twin cab carbody design, with top-mounted headlamps. The first 150 or so
units had the headlamp mounted at waist level, with the lights being mounted in a protruding nacelle. Later on
the headlamps were placed in a recessed nacelle, and from road # 22573 onward, the headlamps were moved to
the top. Newer locos also feature larger windshields, more spacious driver cabin with bucket type seats and
ergonomic controls. The control panel also features a mix of digital and analog displays in newer units (all
analog display in older versions).

Production 
The first WAP-4 unit, #22201 rolled out from CLW on April 25, 1994. They looked exactly like the WAP-1, even sporting the same livery. From 2000, newer versions with many WAP-5 design cues like square  type windscreens ,twin-beam headlights, speed recorders and some changes to the control electronics had been rolled out recently.

However, in the face of the advent of three-phase AC traction motors, IGBT-controlled AC drives, and full computer controls, the DC traction motors was getting increasingly outdated. So the last unit, #25051 was manufactured on November 1, 2015 making 776 of these locomotives produced over 20 years.

Service 
The WAP-4s were developed at the same time IR gave procurement orders for WAP-5 locomotives, as they were meant for more general duties of hauling 24-coach expresses while WAP-5 were specially meant for high-speed operations.

Recently as per directive received from Railway Board [RB] all the loco sheds holding WAP-4 type locomotive have started "Mu" [Multiple Unit] operations. This configuration of Mu WAP-4 locos are being used to haul medium tonnage faster freight trains across IR. The different locomotive sheds of WAP-4 are Arakkonam, Santragachi, Erode, MughalSarai,  Howrah and Bhusaval.

Livery 

All WAP-4s are painted in the same red-black with a yellow/cream band livery, though the shade of the red will differ from shed to shed, from the blazing crimson red of Santragachi SRC/SER to the orange of Erode ED/SR.

Locomotive sheds

See also

Indian Railways
Locomotives of India
Rail transport in India

References

Notes

Bibliography

Electric locomotives of India
25 kV AC locomotives
Co-Co locomotives
Railway locomotives introduced in 1994
5 ft 6 in gauge locomotives